His Western Way is a 1912 American short silent Western film directed by Romaine Fielding. It stars Fielding himself and Mary Ryan. The film was produced by the Lubin Manufacturing Company and distributed by General Film Company.

Cast
 Romaine Fielding – The Cowboy
 Mary Ryan
 Robyn Adair – Percy, the Man About Town

References

External links
 

1912 films
1912 Western (genre) films
1912 short films
American black-and-white films
American silent short films
Films directed by Romaine Fielding
Lubin Manufacturing Company films
Silent American Western (genre) films
1910s American films